So I Married an Anti-fan is a South Korean novel written by Kim Eun-jung, first published on September 27, 2010, and was reissued as a two-part full-length version on February 6, 2016. Exploring the nature of stardom and fandom culture in the K-pop scene, the novel centers on the unlikely relationship between a magazine reporter and a famous idol of whom the former became an ardent anti-fan after an eventful encounter.

Characters

Main
Lee Geun-young
Hoo Joon

Supporting

Seo Ji-hyang
Choi Jae-joon (JJ)
Oh In-hyung
Ko Soo-hwan
Shin Mi-jung

Other media

Film

TV series

Webtoon
 So I Married an Anti-fan (2011)
 So I Married the Anti-fan (2018)

Notelist

References

21st-century South Korean novels